Crambus icarus is a moth in the family Crambidae. It was described by Stanisław Błeszyński in 1961. It is found in Kenya.

References

Crambini
Moths described in 1961
Moths of Africa